The discography of American R&B and gospel singer Fantasia, consists of seven studio albums and 24 singles. At the age of nineteen, she won the third season of American Idol, earning a record deal with 19 Entertainment and J Records. The season's coronation song, "I Believe", debuted at number one on the Billboard Hot 100. It also peaked at number one in Canada, in addition to reaching numbers four and twenty in Australia and New Zealand, respectively.

Later in 2004, she released her debut studio album, Free Yourself, which debuted at number eight on the Billboard 200, and number two on the Top R&B/Hip-Hop Albums chart. It was eventually certified Platinum by the Recording Industry Association of America, and as of August 2010, has sold over 1.8 million copies in the US. The album spawned two US R&B top five singles include the title track, and "Truth Is". "Baby Mama" was also released, and charted on the Hot 100, while "It's All Good" and "Ain't Gon' Beg You" were also released. After the release of her debut album, Fantasia also appeared on "Hypothetically", a single from Lyfe Jennings' album, Lyfe 268-192.

Fantasia's self-titled, second studio album, was released in 2006. Although selling 133,000 discs in its first week of availability, the album only managed to peak at number nineteen in the US. However, it did reach number three on the R&B albums chart, and was eventually certified Gold in the US. The album contained the single, "When I See U", which is Fantasia's most successful single to date other than her Idol coronation single. "When I See U" peaked at thirty-two on the Hot 100, and spent eight weeks at number one the US R&B chart. The song was certified Gold in the US, and according to Billboard, ranks at number eight on the 2000s decade-end R&B chart. Fantasia also spawned two other singles: "Hood Boy", featuring rapper Big Boi, and "Only One U". In 2007, Fantasia was also a featured artist on Aretha Franklin's single, "Put You Up on Game".

After a four-year hiatus, Fantasia returned in 2010 with the release of Back to Me, which debuted at number two on the Billboard 200, and became her first album to top the R&B albums chart. Its lead single "Bittersweet" reached number seven on the US R&B chart. The album also spawned the single "I'm Doin' Me", which has peaked in the top twenty of the US R&B chart.

Fantasia released her fourth studio album, Side Effects of You, on April 23, 2013, which debuted at number two on the Billboard 200 and number one on the R&B albums chart. The album is Fantasia's first release on RCA Records after her previous record label J Records dissolved in 2011. The album was preceded by the singles "Lose to Win" on January 8 and "Without Me" on April 17, 2013. "Without Me" debuted at number 74 on the Billboard Hot 100.

As of March 2018, Fantasia had sold more than three million albums in the United States.

Albums

Studio albums

Singles

As lead artist

As featured artist

Other charted songs

Album appearances

Music videos

References

External links
 
 Fantasia music videography at MTV.com
 [ Fantasia at Allmusic.com]
 
 

Discography
American Idol discographies
Discographies of American artists
Rhythm and blues discographies
Soul music discographies